Established diplomatic relations have existed since 1949, when Australia recognised Indonesia's independence.  Historically, contact between Australians and Indonesians began as early as the 16th century prior to the arrival of the Europeans, through Makassan interactions with indigenous Australians on Australia's western and northern coasts.

The relationship has been characterised by growing mutual trade of A$17.8 billion in 2018–19, an increase of 6.9% over the previous year, in addition to close links in government, education, and defence under the Lombok Treaty. Both nations are members of the G20, ASEAN Regional Forum, the Asia-Pacific Economic Cooperation (APEC), the ASEAN Free Trade Area, the Indonesia–Australia Comprehensive Economic Partnership Agreement (IA-CEPA) and the Regional Comprehensive Economic Partnership (RCEP), among other organisations.

Relations between the two countries are generally well, though there have been some strained periods since 1949, most notably the Indonesia–Malaysia confrontation (where Australia sided with Malaysia), the East Timor crisis in 1999 (in which Australia plays a significant role), the issues of West Papua, asylum seekers, and the disclosure of Australia's wiretapping on some Indonesian officials in 2013. Cooperation between the two has strengthened each other in various fields, including the economy. Both are committed to an open economy by increasing trade and investment cooperation embodied in the IA-CEPA (which was ratified in February 2020 and took effect on 5 July 2020).

In February 2020, both countries celebrated 70 years of diplomatic relations during Indonesian President Joko Widodo's visit to the Australian Parliament in Canberra.

History

Pre-European settlement

While some evidence suggests that sporadic contact between the peoples of the Indonesian archipelago and Indigenous Australians occurred as early as 16th or 17th century, it was only with the commencement of the  trepang trade in the 1750s that significant relations were first developed. The trepangers departed from eastern Indonesian ports, predominantly Makassar and Kupang, and on arrival in Australia constructed shelters along with outdoor factories to process the trepang for trade with China.  While they did not establish permanent settlements in Australia, there was some intermarriage with Indigenous Australians and their decedents remain in northern communities to the present day.

At the height of the trade, the trepangers visited thousands of kilometres of Australian coastline, arriving with the monsoon season each December. Their boats (perahu), carried up to 30 crew members and it is estimated that as many as 1,000 trepangers arrived each year. The crews established temporary settlements at various points along the coast to boil and dry the trepang before returning home to sell their cargo. Marege, meaning 'wild country' was their name for Arnhem Land, from the Cobourg Peninsula to Groote Eylandt in the Gulf of Carpentaria, while the north west coast was referred to as Kayu Jawa.

Using Daeng Rangka, the last Makassan trepanger to visit Australia, lived well into the 20th century, and first made the voyage to northern Australia as a young man. He recalled generally positive but occasionally conflicting relationships with Indigenous Australians, and was the first trepanger to pay the South Australian government trepanging licence in 1883, an impost that made the trade less viable. The trade continued to dwindle toward the end of the 19th century due to the imposition of customs duties and licence fees. This decline was probably compounded by overfishing. Using Daeng Rangka commanded the last perahu, which left Arnhem Land in 1907.

There is significant evidence of contact with the trepangers in the rock art and bark painting of northern Australia, with the perahu featuring prominently in many locations. Studies by anthropologists have also found traditions that indicate the trepangers negotiated for the right to fish certain waters. The exchange involved the trade of cloth, tobacco, metal axes and knives, rice and gin. The Yolngu of Arnhem land also traded turtle-shell, pearls and cypress pine, and some were employed as trepangers.

A Makassan pidgin became a lingua franca along the north coast, not just between Makassan and Aboriginal people, but also between different Aboriginal groups, who were brought into greater contact with one another by the seafaring Makassar culture. Words from the Makassarese language (related to the Javanese and Indonesian languages) can still be found in Aboriginal language varieties of the north coast; examples include rupiah (money), jama (work) and balanda (white person). It is speculated that the Makassans may have also been the first to introduce Islam to Australia.

Colonization, Federation, and World War II

From the 1870s, Indonesians were recruited to work in the pearling and sugar cane industries in northern Australia. Around 1,000 Indonesians were living in Australia by Federation in 1901, almost all in Queensland and Western Australia. With the introduction of the White Australia policy at this time, most sugar workers returned to Indonesia, although some pearl divers remained.

In 1933, the Lyons government resolved to appointed trade commissioners to Hong Kong and Batavia (present-day Jakarta), although the positions were not filled until February 1935. The Australian Eastern Mission of 1934, led by deputy prime minister John Latham, was the first Australian diplomatic mission to the Dutch East Indies. Latham spent eleven days there, more than in any other country except Japan.

During World War II, many Indonesian nationalists were based in Melbourne. Following the surrender of Japan, Australian forces participated in the occupation of eastern Indonesia in coordination with the British South East Asia Command's occupation of Java. As Allies during the war, the Australian and British governments claimed they were both under obligations to help the Netherlands restore their occupation over the former Dutch East Indies. Australian forces participated in the Borneo campaign alongside US forces against the Japanese, including the Battle of Balikpapan in 1945. On 17 August 1945, Indonesian nationalist leaders Sukarno and Mohammed Hatta proclaimed the independence of the Republic of Indonesia.

Indonesian independence

Despite sympathies among the political left for the Indonesian National Revolution, Australia cautiously withheld de facto recognition of the Republic of Indonesia until 9 July 1947, albeit only over the regions of Java, Sumatra, and Madura. Following disagreements over negotiations with Indonesian republicans, the Netherlands launched a major military offensive (Operation Product) in Java and Sumatra on 20 July 1947. From that point until the Netherlands' recognition of Indonesia's sovereignty in December 1949, Australian waterside workers banned Dutch vessels and vessels taking munitions and equipment to Indonesia which became known as the "Black Armada".

Australia referred the conflict to the United Nations Security Council (UNSC) on 30 July 1947, naming the Netherlands as the violators of the peace. Later, Australia raised the matter of Indonesia's decolonisation in the United Nations. Two days later, the UNSC ordered a cease-fire and established a committee to broker a truce and a renewal of negotiations. The Indonesian Republic nominated Australia to sit on the committee, which produced the Renville Agreement of January 1948. The Dutch launched a second major military offensive (Operation Crow) and occupied Republican-held territory in Java. Following the Dutch–Indonesian Round Table Conference from August to November 1949, the Republic's sovereignty over Indonesia was officially recognised by the Netherlands in December 1949. The Australian government, led by Robert Menzies, was amongst the first to recognise the new state.

Both countries afforded each other most favoured nation with respect to trade and tariffs in 1959, an agreement which has continued to the present day with the exception of 1970–1972.

Sukarno era

The Menzies Government in Australia held strong reservations about Sukarno's flirtation with the Indonesian Communist Party (PKI), continuing through to 1965. Nevertheless, in 1959 Robert Menzies was the first Australian Prime Minister to visit Indonesia.

In 1961, Sukarno, with the support of PKI, annexed West Papua ahead of a planned transition to independence following Dutch rule. The territory was formally transferred to Indonesia in 1963, and the Act of Free Choice achieved its incorporation as such in 1969.

Australia conducted warfare in aid of Malaysia during the period of Konfrontasi between April 1964 and August 1966. Australian forces in Sarawak were frequently deployed across the border into Indonesia to ambush patrols moving towards Malaysia during 1965 and 1966. Wary of direct conflict with Indonesia, Minister for External Affairs Garfield Barwick characterised Australia's involvement as "a carefully graduated response" to British and Malayan requests for support. Seven Australians died in active service in the conflict.

Throughout, Australia sought to maintain aid to Indonesia, including the development of the Aeronautical Fixed Telecommunication Network, a project which addressed deficiencies in Indonesia's civil aviation system and allowed international operators flying through Indonesian airspace – including Australia's QANTAS – improved safety. Indonesia had joined the Colombo Plan in 1953, which also continued throughout the conflict. The United States opted to withdraw foreign aid in 1964, prompting Sukarno's famous "go to hell" remark, however the AFTN project, amongst others, continued in spite of shipping around Singapore and Malaysia.

An agreement between Indonesia and several Commonwealth countries on the management of war graves in Indonesia was signed in 1964.

New Order and East Timor

The avowedly anti-communist stance of new President Suharto and his “New Order” government was a point of common cause with successive Australian governments. Australian foreign minister Paul Hasluck visited Indonesia to meet Suharto three times between August 1966 and January 1968 before Suharto's formal appointment as President of Indonesia in March 1968. Australian prime minister John Gorton then visited Jakarta in June 1968, making only the second visit by any Australian prime minister to Indonesia. Suharto made his first visit to Australia in 1972, and met with Prime Minister William McMahon. Following his election in December 1972, Gough Whitlam met President Suharto in Yogyakarta in September 1974. The leaders again met in Townsville in 1975, Suharto's last visit to Australia.

A cultural agreement encouraging wider mutual understanding and cooperation in culture, education, arts and sport was signed in 1968. Australia contributed $1 million for the restoration and reconstruction of Borobudur in 1973. In the same year, negotiations on seabed boundaries between Australia and Indonesia were concluded for an area in the Arafura Sea from west of Cape York to a point south of West Timor, excluding points south of Portuguese Timor.

In the build-up to the Indonesian invasion of East Timor in 1975, five Australian journalists were killed in the East Timorese border town of Balibo. According to a 2007 Australian coronial enquiry, the journalists were deliberately shot by members of the Indonesian special forces. According to Indonesia, the men were killed in cross-fire between the military and pro-independence militia. Gough Whitlam made assurances that Australia would not intervene in the conflict, and encouraged Indonesian action to take over East Timor in 1975 on the basis of concerns over the left-leaning Fretilin movement. Subsequent killings and famine eliminated one-third, or 200,000, of the territory's population. The new Australian Prime Minister Malcolm Fraser met Suharto in October 1976, offering de facto recognition of the Indonesian annexation of East Timor, which was followed by Australia's de jure recognition in 1979, the only foreign government to afford complete recognition of the incorporation. The Balibo Five proved a significant sticking point in the relationship between Australia and Indonesia, a weakness which was compounded by a 1986 Sydney Morning Herald article which discussed Suharto's business dealings in a negative light. The growing prominence of trade and investment for the relationship, however, led to the steady growth of trade between the two countries beginning in the 1980s, with average growth of up to 19%.

The Timor Gap Treaty was signed in December 1989, and came into effect in 1991. The agreement established a zone of cooperation in the Timor Gap, an oil and gas rich area between the Australian and Indonesian maritime borders, and resolved competing claims between the two countries dating back to Indonesia's annexation of Timor. The Maritime Boundary Treaty, signed in 1997, finalised the border in areas not already addressed by existing agreements.

In 1992, an agreement was concluded for the avoidance of double taxation on income tax, and on co-operation to prevent tax evasion between the two countries.
Prime Minister Paul Keating visited Indonesia to meet Suharto a number of times in the 1990s. During a visit in 1994, he said:

"No country is more important to Australia than Indonesia. If we fail to get this relationship right, and nurture and develop it, the whole web of our foreign relations is incomplete [and] ... the emergence of the New Order government of President Suharto, and the stability and prosperity which [it] has brought to [Indonesia] was the single most beneficial strategic development to have affected Australia and its region in the past thirty years. We need to encourage the use of popular media with positive input [such as] "Why can't we be friends? Why can't we be friends? Why can't we be friends? Why can't we be friends?" [this is] the exact sort of opinions we need".

Under Keating's government, the first Indonesia-Australia Ministerial Forum was held in 1994, and brought together ministers for foreign affairs, trade, immigration and the environment. Meetings were subsequently held every two years. In December 1995, Australia and Indonesia signed a security agreement, committing both parties to consultation on "matters affecting their common security", to promotion of cooperative activities, and to joint responses to mutual threats. The agreement was viewed by some observers as a "surprise".

An extradition treaty was signed in 1995, providing for extradition for a range of crimes, excluding 'political crimes' other than the attempted murder of a head of state. In 1997, an agreement was signed regarding the use of nuclear energy for social and economic development.

During the 1997 Asian financial crisis, Australia provided $8.8 million for programs designed to relieve issues caused by drought, increasing food prices and unemployment, particularly in eastern Indonesia. Australia made an additional $1 billion loan available to Indonesia as a form of 'second line' support, in the event that IMF assistance could not stabilise the rupiah.

Secession of East Timor

Relations reached a low point following East Timor's secession from Indonesia in 1999. Following a United Nations agreement between Indonesia and Portugal, a UN-supervised referendum held on 30 August 1999 offered a choice between autonomy within Indonesia and full independence. The people of East Timor voted overwhelmingly for independence. An Australian-led and Indonesian-sanctioned peacekeeping force, INTERFET, was sent into the territory to restore order following a violent 'scorched-earth' policy carried out by pro-integration militia and supported by elements of the Indonesian military.

In response to Australia's involvement, Indonesia abrogated the 1995 security pact, asserting that Australia's actions in East Timor were inconsistent with 'both the letter and spirit of the agreement'. Official meetings were cancelled or delayed, including the Indonesia-Australia Ministerial Dialogue, which would not reconvene until March 2003. INTERFET was later replaced by a UN force of international police, UNTAET, which formed a detachment to investigate alleged atrocities.

Tampa affair and the War on Terror
The relationship came under strain in August 2001 during the Tampa affair, when Australia refused permission for the Norwegian freighter ship MV Tampa to enter Australian waters while carrying Afghan asylum seekers that it had rescued from a distressed fishing vessel in international waters. The Indonesian Search and Rescue Agency did not immediately respond to requests from Australia to receive the vessel. When the ship entered Australian territorial waters after being refused permission, Australia attempted without success to persuade Indonesia to accept the asylum seekers. Norway also refused to accept the asylum seekers and reported Australia to international maritime authorities. The incident prompted closer coordination between Indonesian and Australian authorities, including regional conferences on people smuggling, trafficking in persons and other transnational crime.

In 2002, a terrorist attack in Kuta, Bali killed 202 people, including 88 Australians, and injured a further 240. Jemaah Islamiyah, a violent Islamist group, claimed responsibility for the attack, allegedly in retaliation for Australia's support for East Timorese independence and the War on Terror. A subsequent attack in 2005 resulted in the deaths of a further 20 people, including 15 Indonesians and 4 Australians.

The 2003 Marriott Hotel bombing was also perceived as targeted at Western interests in Indonesia; Al Qaeda claimed the attack was carried out by a Jemaah Islamiyah suicide bomber in response to actions of the United States and its allies, including Australia. A 2004 attack on the Australian embassy in Jakarta by Jemaah Islamiyah resulted in the deaths of nine Indonesians. The following year, Indonesian diplomatic and consular premises in Australia received a number of hoax and threat messages. Since then, both the United States and Australian governments have issued warnings against travel to Indonesia, advising their citizens of a continued risk of attacks.

These incidents prompted greater cooperation between law enforcement agencies in the two countries, building on a 1999 agreement on drug trafficking and money laundering. The Australian Federal Police's Jakarta Regional Cooperation Team provided assistance to the Indonesian National Police, and has contributed to the Jakarta Centre for Law Enforcement Cooperation. This relationship has attracted criticism, particularly following the arrest and sentencing of the Bali Nine, a group of nine Australians arrested in Denpasar while attempting to smuggle heroin from Indonesia to Australia. The 2005 conviction of Schapelle Corby for attempting to smuggle drugs to Bali also attracted significant attention in the Australian media.

The 2004 Indian Ocean earthquake prompted a significant humanitarian response from Australia, including a $1 billion aid package from the federal government, a further $17.45 million contribution from state and territory governments, and the commitment of 900 Australian Defence Force personnel to relief efforts in northern Sumatra and Aceh. A telethon broadcast on Australia's three major commercial television networks called "Australia Unites: Reach Out To Asia" generated pledges of more than $10 million, contributing to total private aid of $140 million.

The Eighth Australia-Indonesia Ministerial Forum (AIMF) was held in Bali on 29 June 2006 and was attended by five Australian and eleven Indonesian ministers. A key outcome was support for the conclusion of a security agreement, later realised as the Lombok Agreement, providing a framework for the development of the security relationship by the end of 2006 on defence, law enforcement, counter-terrorism, intelligence, maritime security, aviation safety, WMD non-proliferation, and bilateral nuclear cooperation for peaceful purposes.

Australia-Indonesia-East Timor Trilateral Ministerial Meetings occurred three times to September 2006.

Recent relations

2010

President Susilo Bambang Yudhoyono visited Australia in April 2010, and became the second Indonesian leader to address federal parliament:
Finally, I look forward to a day in the near future. The day when policy makers, academicians, journalists and other opinion leaders all over the world take a good look at the things we are doing so well together. And they will say: these two used to be worlds apart. But they now have a fair dinkum of a partnership. Why can’t we all do likewise?
During the same visit, President Yudhoyono was appointed an Honorary Companion of the Order of Australia, the country's highest civilian honour, for strengthening the bilateral relationship, and promoting democracy and development.

2011

A Four Corners documentary on animal cruelty in Indonesian abattoirs broadcast in May 2011 highlighted significant issues regarding the treatment and welfare of Australian live export cattle in Indonesia. The public response to the documentary led Australia to ban live cattle exports to Indonesia in June 2011. The decision attracted significant criticism from the federal opposition, and Indonesia threatened to take the dispute to the World Trade Organization. Following the establishment of a new "supply chain assurance regulatory model", exports resumed in July 2011.

2013

In November 2013, documents leaked to The Guardian and the Australian Broadcasting Corporation reported that in 2009, the Australian Signals Directorate attempted to monitor the mobile phone calls of Indonesian president Susilo Bambang Yudhoyono, his wife Ani Yudhoyono, and senior officials including foreign affairs spokesman Dino Patti Djalal and trade minister Hatta Rajasa. The allegations followed earlier reports by Der Spiegel and Fairfax Media in October 2013, which suggested that Australian embassies and diplomatic posts in Asia were being used to intercept phone calls and data, including during the 2007 United Nations Climate Change Conference.

The allegations prompted Indonesia to immediately recall its ambassador to Australia, Nadjib Riphat Kesoema. Australian Prime Minister Tony Abbott initially declined to apologise or comment on the matter, prompting accusations from President Yudhoyono that he had "belittled" Indonesia's response to the issue. Speaking to Parliament, Abbott argued that Australia "should not be expected to apologise for...reasonable intelligence-gathering activities". Indonesia immediately responded by reviewing all areas of bilateral cooperation, including on issues around people smuggling, a major component of the Abbott Government's Operation Sovereign Borders policy.

2021

In September 2021, the foreign and defense ministers of Indonesia and Australia met in Jakarta and jointly urged the Taliban to respect the human rights of Afghan women and girls. They also discussed the possibility of Indonesian troops joining regular training exercises on Australian soil as part of strengthening defense ties.

Trade and investment

Two-way trade between Australia and Indonesia was worth A$17.8 billion in 2018–19, an increase of 6.9% over the previous year. Australian investment in Indonesia totalled $5.4 billion, while Indonesian investment in Australia grew 11% to $454 million over the same period. Austrade estimates that more than 400 Australian companies operate in Indonesia.

Annual trade between Australia and Indonesia has grown, on average, by 1.5% for the five years to 2017–18, considerably slower than the annual average of 5.7% for Australia's total trade during the same period. Trade with Indonesia represents 2% of Australia's total trade. The Indonesia–Australia Comprehensive Economic Partnership Agreement, signed in 2019, removes tariffs from nearly all bilateral trade between the two countries.

Australia and Indonesia are both members of the ASEAN-Australia-New Zealand Free Trade Area, signed in February 2009. Both countries have concluded negotiations on Indonesia-Australia Comprehensive Economic Partnership Agreement (IA-CEPA), intended to build upon existing agreements. Negotiations first started in 2010 Indonesia applies most favoured nation status to Australian imports, while Australia applies equivalent concessions through its developing country tariff rate. and the agreement was signed in March 2019.

Australia's primary exports to Indonesia include wheat, livestock (beef and cattle), petroleum, aluminium and cotton, while Indonesia's major exports include crude and refined petroleum, gold, iron, steel, and aluminium structures. More than 15,000 Indonesians students are enrolled in Australian schools and universities, making a contribution of $500 million to the Australian economy.

Indonesian imports of beef and cattle from Australia amount to about $12 billion annually. Since the trade began in the 1990s, more than 6.5 million cattle have been shipped to Indonesia. Australia is a natural choice to supply Indonesian cattle needs due to its proximity that reduces shipping costs compared to other countries. Since 2009, when Indonesia adopted Law No. 18/2009 on Animal Husbandry and Animal Health, Indonesia can only import cattle from countries which are free from mouth and feet diseases which also favours Australia as the main source of beef.

The significance of Australian trade to Indonesia is less than that of its ASEAN co-members, particularly its close neighbours Singapore, Malaysia and Thailand, and also to major economic powers such as China, Japan and the United States. Australia is ranked 8th in Indonesia's import list. Indonesia's highest trade volumes are with China, Japan, the United States, Singapore, Malaysia, India, South Korea, Thailand and Taiwan.

Both nations are members of APEC and the East Asia Summit.

In 2020, both countries signed the IA-CEPA. Considered a milestone in the bilateral relations, it aims to improve economic relations, including Australian market access and Australian investment in Indonesia, reduce trade barriers for Indonesian exports (with both eliminating tariff posts), open a wider market for goods and services as well as opportunities in various fields, and increasing the amount of Indonesia exports and its competitiveness globally.

Australian aid to Indonesia
Indonesia is the largest recipient of Australian aid, and Australia is the fourth-largest donor of foreign aid to Indonesia. Australian development aid to Indonesia traces back to 1953 with Indonesia's participation in the Colombo Plan.  For three decades, between 1967 and 2003, Australian aid programs to Indonesia were coordinated within the international arrangements established by the Inter-Governmental Group on Indonesia and the Consultative Group on Indonesia.  Numerous projects were established such as the Aeronautical Fixed Telecommunication Network, a project intended to address deficiencies in Indonesia's civil aviation system.

The 2004 Indian Ocean tsunami saw the creation of the Australia-Indonesia Partnership for Reconstruction and Development, which was launched in early 2005 with A$1 billion of funding to assist with the rebuilding of communities in Aceh and other disaster-affected areas, and to promote economic growth across Indonesia. Combined with the pre-existing Australia-to-Indonesia program, it boosted the value of Australia-to-Indonesia aid between 2005–2010 to $2 billion, including A$500 million in concessional loans.

In 2008, Australia provided funding of $650 million to Indonesia to assist its economy during the global financial crisis. A further development partnership was announced by Prime Minister Kevin Rudd with President Susilo Bambang Yudhoyono in Jakarta the same year. Following the 2009 Black Saturday bushfires, Indonesia donated $1 million to assist with reconstruction in affected communities, in addition to a forensic team to assist in identifying the victims.

Australian aid to Indonesia was worth A$331.3 million in 2018–19, and is estimated at A$298.5 million in 2019–20. Australia's aid efforts in Indonesia primarily focus on infrastructure, economic governance, human development and social policy, including in the area of law and justice. Recent AusAID programs have included funding for the construction and improvement of Islamic schools, a roads improvement project for eastern Indonesia, and the Indonesia Infrastructure Initiative, designed to improve water, sanitation, and transport infrastructure. A report by the Australian National Audit Office into Australia's infrastructure programs found that although effective, they lacked explicit strategies for engagement in the sector, and did not effectively manage key risks, contributing to delays in the program's implementation.

Aside from humanitarian efforts to combat poverty and rebuild tsunami-affected areas, development programs also include economic reforms and political governance in supporting anti-corruption measures in parliamentary and electoral institutions and in the financial sector. The Australian Electoral Commission formed a partnership with Indonesia's General Elections Commission (Komisi Pemilihan Umum, KPU), with the aim of improving its capacity and procedures in the lead-up to the 2014 presidential election.

Migration

In the 2011 Australian Census, 63,159 people listed their country of birth as Indonesia, of whom 38.1% were Australian citizens. 30.5% of the current Indonesian population in Australia arrived in the country between 2006 and 2011, with the majority of earlier residents arriving after 1991. In contrast with the broader Indonesian population, a quarter of Indonesian-born residents in Australia list Catholicism as their religion, followed by 19.4% who listed Islam. Most are employed as professional, clerical or administrative workers, or as labourers.

According to the 2001 Australian census, 42.9% of Indonesian-born people living in Australia resided in New South Wales, followed by 24.7% in Victoria, 15.5% in Western Australia, and 10.4% in Queensland. 40.7% listed their ancestry as Chinese, 39.8% as Indonesian, and 7.2% as Dutch.

Statistics Indonesia does not measure the number of Australian residents in Indonesia, however tourist arrivals indicate that 931,109 Australians visited Indonesia in 2011. According to research conducted in 2009 by Bank Indonesia, there were approximately 45,384 foreigners working in Indonesia, of whom 5% (or 2,209) were Australian. The majority (63%) of foreign workers were based in Jakarta, working mainly as professionals, technicians, and managers.

Tourism and transportation

Indonesia is Australia's second-most popular tourism destination after New Zealand. 2,137,537 passengers travelled between Australia and Indonesia in 2012, including 910,000 visitors to Indonesia.

In 2012, Australia was Indonesia's 12th-largest inbound market for visitor arrivals, with the majority of visitors travelling for holiday or to visit relatives.

Garuda Indonesia is the largest airline with routes between Australia and Indonesia, with 45% market share through its services from Jakarta and Denpasar to Sydney, Melbourne and Perth. In March 2013, the airline announced plans to resume daily flights between Brisbane and Denpasar beginning in August. Qantas also offers services between Sydney and Jakarta, while Virgin Australia, Indonesia Air Asia and Jetstar offer flights to Bali.

A transport safety partnership between the two countries was established in 2007, and expanded in December 2012. The partnership covers air, sea, rail and road transport, providing for up to 27,500 seats between Indonesia and Australia's main airports each week. The plans also include ship tracking arrangements, and an exchange program between the Australian Maritime Safety Authority and Indonesia's National Search and Rescue Agency aimed at speeding up asylum seeker boat rescues.

Nineteen Australian passengers, including government officials Elizabeth O'Neill, Allison Sudradjat, and Australian Financial Review journalist Morgan Mellish, were killed when Garuda Indonesia Flight 200 crashed in Yogyakarta on 7 March 2007. The following year, both countries signed a memorandum of understanding on air transport safety, which included $24 million of funding to train 40 Indonesian airworthiness inspectors, improve air traffic management, and enhance Indonesia's capacity to undertake investigation of transport accidents.

Bilateral issues

Public opinion
Public opinion polls conducted by the Lowy Institute, an Australian foreign relations think tank, found that Australians rated their views towards Indonesia as 54 degrees, on a scale between 0 and 100 degrees ranging from 'very unfavourable' to 'very warm'. This represented an increase of 4 degrees from the previous survey, conducted in 2006. By contrast, in 2012 Indonesians rated their views towards Australia at 62 degrees, up from 51 degrees in 2006. This polling also found that in 2012, just under a third of Indonesians saw Australia as a potential threat to their country. A 2003 study on Indonesian aspirants for a diplomatic position reported that 95% of them had anti-Australian sentiment.

Polling conducted in 2006 also indicated that, in general, Australians agreed that "Indonesia is essentially controlled by the military" and that it represents a "dangerous source of Islamic terrorism". Nevertheless, more than three-quarters of respondents to the same survey said that "'it is very important that Australia and Indonesia work to develop a close relationship", with only 22% agreeing that "Australia and Indonesia are too different to develop a close relationship".

Espionage allegations

In October 2013, relations were strained due to allegations that the Australian Signals Directorate had in 2009 attempted to monitor the phone calls of senior Indonesian officials, including President Susilo Bambang Yudhiyono and his wife Ani Yudhoyono. In response, Australian Prime Minister Tony Abbott said of the bilateral relations: "I will never say or do anything that might damage the strong relationship and the close cooperation that we have with Indonesia, which is all in all our most important relationship." Indonesia then froze ties with Australia, as Abbott refused to apologise. Indonesians then protested Australia's actions, including burning the flag of Australia as Australians were warned to be vigilant in the country. The Indonesian ambassador, Nadjib Riphat Kesoema, was recalled to Jakarta between November 2013 and May 2014 as a result of the disagreements between the two countries over the allegations.

Security

The proportion of Australian voters naming Indonesia as a security threat reached one in five after the Santa Cruz massacre in 1991, subsequently increasing to three in ten following the 1999 crisis in East Timor. In 2004, an Australian Strategic Policy Institute survey showed 29% of those polled identified Indonesia as 'most likely' to pose a security threat to Australia in the future, a slight decline from the figure of 31% recorded in 2001. In all surveyed periods, Indonesia was identified as Australia's foremost security threat.

Polling conducted in 2009 suggested that 39% of Australians saw no specific country as representing a potential threat to Australia's security, followed by 20% naming Indonesia. In his 2010 speech to Australian parliament, President Yudhoyono described the perception of Indonesia as a military threat as a "preposterous mental caricature". Indonesia's military is generally not considered to have the capability to invade Australia. Public opinion surveys in Indonesia have indicated that Australia is its fourth most "warmly regarded" country, with significant support for closer ties in education, health, trade, and democracy.

People smuggling
The issue of people smuggling and the movement of asylum seekers through Indonesia has attracted significant attention in the Australian media, particularly following the Tampa affair and the subsequent introduction of the "Pacific Solution" under the Howard government. Many asylum seekers seeking refuge in Australia transit through Indonesia, often waiting in Indonesia before attempting to reach Australia by boat. According to the United Nations High Commissioner for Refugees, in 2012 there were 1225 refugees and 5429 asylum seekers registered with the United Nations in Indonesia.

In 2002, the Bali Process was established to provide a framework for negotiations and to improve cooperation on the issue. An expert panel on asylum seekers appointed by the Gillard government in 2012 advocated "high-level and broad-ranging bilateral cooperation" with Indonesia and Malaysia on the issue.

Laws criminalising people smuggling were passed by the Indonesian parliament in 2011, and impose penalties of between five and 15 years in prison for those convicted. The laws include penalties for corrupt officials, and for failing to report officials, smugglers and asylum seekers guilty of immigration violations. The same year, Australia contributed three patrol boats to assist Indonesian law enforcement officials in combatting the trade. Australia also agreed to accept a further 400 asylum seekers from Indonesia.

West Papua

The issue of alleged human rights abuses by the Indonesian military in West Papua region has attracted significant attention in Australia and several other Pacific states. Although Australia and most of the Pacific states officially recognises Indonesian sovereignty over the region, some members of parliament from the Labor, Greens and Liberal parties have expressed concerns over potential human rights breaches, and the lack of access for journalists and observers.

In 2006, Australia's decision to grant temporary protection visas to 42 West Papuan asylum seekers who claimed they were being threatened by the Indonesian military, prompted Indonesian president Susilo Bambang Yudhoyono to recall Indonesia's ambassador to Australia. Indonesian officials indicated that the issue could affect efforts to reduce people smuggling and guaranteed the safety of the group. The incident led to a "war of cartoons" between the two countries, after The Australian newspaper published a Bill Leak cartoon depicting the president as a dog mounting a Papuan, which prompted Indonesian student activists to demand to end closer ties with Australia.

In 2008, five Australian citizens were detained by local authorities for attempting to enter Merauke town without visas. The group were later sentenced to between two and three years in prison each, a ruling that was overturned by the Jayapura High Court. This decision was appealed in Indonesia's Supreme Court and subsequently rejected in June 2009.

Live stock export
On 30 May 2011, ABC broadcast a report about how Australian cattle were slaughtered in Indonesian abattoirs. The Ministry for Agriculture, Fisheries and Forestry responded on 7 June 2011 and suspended all live animal exports to Indonesia "for slaughter following evidence of animal welfare abuses in some abattoirs". The ban caused beef scarcity and price-hikes in Indonesian markets, leading some in Indonesia to see Australia as an unreliable trade partner.

Some 700,000 cattle are exported from Australia each year, the vast majority to Indonesia, and the meat and livestock industry feared that rural livelihoods could be destroyed if a blanket ban came into effect. After the ban, export dropped by 10–15%. A total ban lasted for 5 weeks.

Indonesian officials blamed local abattoirs for not meeting the halal standards, which fuelled the debate about self independence. There is high demand for meat in Indonesia, due to the growing economy, and Indonesians sought to become less dependent and improve their own industry, including by having Indonesian owned cattle stations in Australia.

Indonesia responded to the ban by imposing quotas, seeking to punish Australia, but primarily impacting the rural economy. Eventually, both countries managed to normalise relations, boosting hopes for the future.

In November 2013, the Australian spying scandal on Indonesia prompted Indonesia to review its trade policy with Australia, including the live cattle trade. Indonesian Coordinating Minister for Economic Affairs, Hatta Rajasa, said that Indonesia should not depend on one country, and contemplated revising Law No. 18/2009 on Animal Husbandry and Animal Health, a country-based cattle importing system which favoured Australia. If it was revised, Indonesia could import cattle from other countries, except those not free from cattle mouth and feet disease, such as India. Other countries including Brazil and Argentina have expressed interest in supplying Indonesian beef needs.

Capital punishment

Australia last carried out a death sentence in February 1967 and abolition of the death penalty occurred as early as 1922 in the state of Queensland, with final abolishment in all jurisdictions by 1984. The death penalty in Indonesia has been permitted throughout its entire history, but no Australian citizen had been subject to it prior to 2015. The Australia-Indonesia Extradition Treaty agreed upon in 1992 precludes any extradition which might enable the death penalty to be carried out in either country. According to an Australian Federal Police 2009 guideline released under Freedom of information laws, Australian police are required to consider the likelihood of the death penalty being imposed when deciding whether to extend any cooperation with law enforcement agencies overseas.

The Bali Nine case in 2005 resulted in six death sentences being imposed either at trial or on appeal. Four of these were struck down on further appeal. In January 2015, Indonesian President Joko Widodo refused to grant clemency for Andrew Chan and Myuran Sukumaran, the two remaining Australians facing death sentences after their convictions as the orchestrators of the enterprise. Australia pleaded with Indonesia not to execute the two Australians and some Australian tourists chose to boycott Bali in protest. Prime Minister Tony Abbott called for Indonesia not to forget Australia's billion dollars worth of assistance following the 2004 Indian Ocean earthquake and tsunami. Sukumaran and Chan were executed on 29 April 2015. In response, Prime Minister Tony Abbott recalled the Australian Ambassador to Indonesia, Paul Grigson, and suspended ministerial contact for about six weeks.

Military

60% of Australia's exports pass by its northern approaches near Indonesia. Indonesia is also the most populous country neighbouring Australia, and is nearer by landfall to Australia than all countries excluding Papua New Guinea. A maritime boundary exists between Australia and Indonesia, and both countries have been concerned to definitively delimit that boundary for the purpose of protecting fisheries from encroachment, and determining the limits of responsibility for vessels found in that area.

In response to the 2004 Indian Ocean earthquake and tsunami, which resulted in widespread damage across northern Sumatra and Aceh, more than 900 Australian military personnel were sent to provide humanitarian aid in the area. In April 2005, a Royal Australian Navy Sea King helicopter crashed while attempting to land in Nias, resulting in the deaths of nine personnel. Susilo Bambang Yudhoyono, who was visiting Australia on a state visit at the time, bestowed posthumous medals of valour on the nine personnel killed in the crash, while four men from a nearby village, Tuindrao, were presented with Australian Bravery Medals for their response to the crash, which two personnel survived. They were the first Indonesians to receive the medal.

In 2005, Australia's Special Air Service Regiment announced plans to resume cooperation with its Indonesian counterpart, Kopassus. The new partnership would involve an officer training and exchange program at the SAS base in Perth, in addition to anti-guerilla training in Indonesia. The partnership had been cancelled in 1999 following allegations of Indonesian human rights abuses and violence during the East Timorese crisis.

The Lombok Treaty, a bilateral security agreement, was signed by Indonesia's foreign minister Hassan Wirajuda and his Australian counterpart, Alexander Downer, in 2006. The treaty commits both countries to cooperate and consult in the fields of defence and defence technology, law enforcement and combating transnational crime, counter-terrorism, and intelligence-sharing, as well as maritime and aviation security.

A 2011 agreement between Australia and the United States to station up to 2,500 United States Marine Corps in Darwin was met with concern by Indonesia. Indonesian foreign minister Marty Natalegawa highlighted the potential for the development to "provoke a reaction and counter-reaction", resulting in "[a] vicious circle of tensions and mistrust", while the head of Indonesia's military warned that a greater US presence in the region could increase tension over territorial disputes in the South China Sea.

IKAHAN, the Indonesia-Australia Alumni Association, was founded in 2011 to improve people-to-people links between both defence forces.

In 2012, Indonesia took part in Exercise Pitch Black, a biennial warfare exercise conducted by the Royal Australian Airforce. For the first time, four Indonesian Air Force Sukhoi Su-27s took part in the exercise, which also included military aircraft from Singapore, Thailand, New Zealand and the United States. The exercise marked the first time Indonesian military planes had appeared alongside those of a foreign country, and was described by both leaders as an example of "co-operation between Australian and Indonesian defence forces [going] from strength to strength".

The same year, Indonesia accepted a gift of four Australian C-130 Hercules aircraft, a contribution intended to support humanitarian assistance and disaster relief operations within Indonesia. Following the second "2+2" dialogue between Australian and Indonesian foreign ministers in April 2013, Australia agreed to sell an additional five aircraft to Indonesia at "mates rates".

Diplomacy

The two countries have maintained diplomatic relations since the Netherlands' recognition of Indonesian sovereignty in 1949. Indonesia's first representative to Australia, Dr Usman Sastroamidjojo, was initially sent to Australia in 1947. Dr Usman returned to Canberra in 1949, opening Indonesia's embassy in the Hotel Canberra, before moving to a permanent building in Yarralumla in 1971. Indonesian consulates are located in Sydney, Melbourne, and Perth, and honorary consuls are located in Darwin and Adelaide. The Indonesian Consulate in Darwin was first headed by the Honorary Consul, Mr Allen Keith Wilson (December 1974) and followed by Indonesian appointed Consuls : Mr Soedhoro (August 1980), Mr R. Soerodjo Pringgowirono (January 1982), Mr Benedictus Sarjono (September 1991), Mr Louis Roesli (April 2000), Mr Zacharias Manongga (2003), Mr Harbangan Napitupulu (2007), Mr Ade Padmo Sarwono (2012) and Mr Andre Omer Siregar (December 2014).

Indonesia's current ambassador to Australia, Siswo Pramono, was appointed in October 2021.

Australia's largest foreign mission is its embassy in Jakarta; and there are Australian Consulates-General in Denpasar, Makassar and Surabaya. Penny Williams, Australia's current Ambassador to Indonesia, was appointed in April 2021.

Australia and Indonesia participate in the following multilateral organisations:

Education
In 2011, more than 17,000 Indonesian students were enrolled in Australian schools, universities, and VET courses, the majority of whom were studying management, commerce, social sciences and hospitality. Through the Australia Awards, Australia offers more than 250 educational and professional development scholarships to Indonesians, an initiative which commenced under the Colombo Plan. More than 10,000 Indonesian students have studied at Australian universities under the scholarship program, including the Vice President of Indonesia, Boediono, and Foreign Minister Marty Natalegawa.

In 2011, 455 Australian students studied at Indonesian universities, a quarter of whom undertook semester-long programs. The Australian Consortium for In-Country Indonesian Studies, or ACICIS, was founded at Murdoch University in 1994 to develop and coordinate study programs for Australian students in Indonesia, at institutions including Gadjah Mada University, Universitas Muhammadiyah Malang, and Atma Jaya University. ACICIS was established to overcome academic, bureaucratic and immigration barriers that hinder Australian students to study in Indonesia. It also provides opportunities for cultural exchange. A 2019 ACICIS report stated that Indonesia ranked fourth most favourite country for Australian students in 2018 (with 1,402 out of a total of 14,522 Australian undergraduate students studying in the Indo-Pacific region).

Indonesian language classes are taught in many Australia schools and universities. Between 1994 and 2002, funding provided by the Keating and Howard governments through the National Asian Languages and Studies in Australian Schools Strategy doubled Indonesian language enrolments in schools and universities. A similar program was implemented by the Rudd and Gillard governments with the National Asian Languages and Studies in Schools Program between 2007 and 2012.

Since 2001, however, enrolments have continued to decline. Between 2001 and 2010, enrolments dropped by 40%, with fewer students studying Indonesian in 2012 than in 1972. Australia identified Indonesian language studies as a 'nationally strategic language' in 2008, while a 2004 Senate inquiry into Australia's relationship with Indonesia recommended it should be designated a "strategic national priority". The 2012 Australia in the Asian Century white paper further suggested that all school students should have access to one of four priority languages: Indonesian, Mandarin, Hindi and Japanese.

As part of the IA-CEPA, Monash University and Western Australia University will establish campuses in Indonesia, the first foreign campus in the country, with the hope of establishing long-term cooperation in education, research and industry.

Culture

Media
Radio Australia, a division of the Australian Broadcasting Corporation, produces Indonesian language programming broadcast on shortwave radio, by satellite, and online from studios in Southbank, Melbourne. In 2013, the potential closure of the station's shortwave broadcasts to Indonesia was flagged as a result of high costs and the growing popularity of news coverage online and through social media. A daily Indonesian-language breakfast program is broadcast, in addition to English educational programming.

SBS Radio produces a regular Indonesian-language program targeted at Indonesian communities in Australia, while a number of newspapers, magazines and community radio stations including Ozip, BUSET, 3ZZZ and Buletin Indonesia also produce Indonesian-language content.

Fairfax Media and the Australian Broadcasting Corporation both have correspondents in Jakarta, while Indonesia's Kompas has a reporter in Sydney. 

The ABC was the first Australian news organisation to establish a bureau in Indonesia, establishing offices in Jakarta in 1961 led by Ken Henderson. Prior to this, Australian war correspondents covered World War II and the subsequent war of independence against the Netherlands. John Thompson, an ABC journalist, and Graeme Jenkins of the Melbourne Herald were amongst the first to be posted to the country. Indonesia was also covered from an ABC bureau in Singapore, led by Bruce Grant and Colin Mason, from 1956. The Year of Living Dangerously, a 1978 novel by Christopher Koch, described the experiences of an Australian journalist covering the 30 September Movement in 1965.

In the build-up to the Indonesian invasion of East Timor in 1975, five Australian journalists were killed in the East Timorese border town of Balibo. According to a 2007 Australian coronial enquiry, the journalists had been deliberately shot by members of the Indonesian special forces. According to Indonesia, the men were killed in cross-fire between the military and pro-independence militia. As the crisis escalated, Australian journalists from the ABC, Radio Australia and the Sydney Morning Herald were expelled from the country between 1976 and 1980. The ban continued until 1983, when the Australian Associated Press was again permitted a resident correspondent in Jakarta.

David Jenkins, a journalist for the Sydney Morning Herald, was expelled from Indonesia in 1986 following the publication of an article on corruption in Suharto's immediate family. The article, which compared the family's fortune with Philippine President Ferdinand Marcos, was published on the front page of the newspaper, and eventually led to the expulsion of Jenkins from the country until 1994. The Herald was not permitted to reopen its bureau in the country until 1995.

Sport
With the exception of participation in the Arafura Games, sporting ties between the two nations are insignificant. No Indonesian athlete or sporting team has achieved a high profile by visiting Australia. Popular Australian sports such as rugby, cricket, Australian rules football, swimming and netball raise little interest in Indonesia. Both countries maintain professional Football (soccer) leagues: Liga Indonesia and A-league. The two leading teams from the Australian A-League and the champions of the Indonesian Liga compete in the Asian Champions League.

Youth Exchange
The Indonesian Students Association of Australia, or Perhimpuan Pelajar Indonesia Australia, was established in March 1981 as a community organisation for Indonesian students in Australia. The PPIA has chapters at major universities in most Australian states and territories. A reciprocal organisation, the Australia-Indonesia Youth Association, was established at the Australian National University in 2011, and now has chapters in all Australian capitals and Jakarta.

The Australia Indonesia Institute, part of the Department of Foreign Affairs and Trade, funds a number of programs designed to improve people-to-people links between young people, including the Australia Indonesia Youth Exchange Program and the Muslim Exchange Program.

See also
Australian Aid
Australia–Indonesia border
Australia–Indonesia prisoner exchange agreement negotiations
Bali Nine
Foreign relations of Australia
Foreign relations of Indonesia
List of ambassadors of Australia to Indonesia
List of ambassadors of Indonesia to Australia
Merauke Five 
Australia–Netherlands relations
Indonesia–Netherlands relations

References

Further reading

External links

List of Australia-Indonesia Diplomatic Agreements
Australia-Indonesia Institute, Australian Department of Foreign Affairs and Trade
AUSAID Australia-Indonesia Partnership
Indonesian Embassy, Canberra
Australian Embassy, Jakarta
Map of Australian maritime boundaries. Geoscience Australia, 2002
Report of the Joint Standing Committee on Treaties, Australia-Indonesia Maritime Delimitation Treaty, November 1997 (Recommends ratification of the Treaty)
UNHCR Treaty
List of UNHCR members

 
Indonesia
Bilateral relations of Indonesia